Torridgeside Association Football Club is a football club based in Great Torrington, Devon, England.

History
Formed in 1989, Torridgeside joined the North Devon League Division Two in 2003–04, winning it the following season. They were promoted to the Senior Division the year after that, and promoted again to the Premier Division in 2008–09. They won the Premier Division title in 2012–13, and were runners-up in 2015–16, earning promotion to the South West Peninsula League Division One East. At the end of 2018–19 the league was restructured, and, having finished fourth, Torridgeside successfully applied for promotion to the Premier Division East, at Step 6 of the National League System. The club features three adult teams and five youth teams.

On 2 May 2019, Torridgeside were beaten 5–4 by Bovey Tracey after extra time in the final of the Devon Premier Cup.

Honours
North Devon League
Premier Division champions 2012–13
Devon Premier Cup
Runners-up 2018–19

References

External links
Official website

Association football clubs established in 1989
1989 establishments in England
Football clubs in England
Football clubs in Devon
North Devon Football League
South West Peninsula League